All I Want for Christmas Is a Real Good Tan is the seventh studio album by American country music singer Kenny Chesney, released on October 7, 2003. The album was certified gold by the Recording Industry Association of America (RIAA) for sales of over 500,000 copies in the United States. As of December 2016, the album has sold 922,900 copies in the United States .

In addition to original tracks and tropical renditions of traditional Christmas music, the album features three covers. "Christmas in Dixie" was originally recorded by Alabama and features Alabama's lead singer, Randy Owen, as a duet partner. "Thank God for Kids" was previously recorded by The Oak Ridge Boys (and originally by Eddy Raven), while "Pretty Paper" was originally recorded by Willie Nelson. Chesney's rendition of "Silent Night" features his mother and her twin sister, who are credited as the Grigsby Twins.

Track listing

Personnel
 Wyatt Beard – background vocals
 Shannon Brown – background vocals
 Pat Buchanan – electric guitar
 Melonie Cannon – background vocals
 Mark Casstevens – ukulele
 Karen Chandler – background vocals
 Kenny Chesney – lead vocals
 Chip Davis – background vocals
 Grigsby Twins – vocals on "Silent Night"
 Tim Hensley – banjo, background vocals
 Wes Hightower – background vocals
 John Hobbs – Hammond organ, piano, synthesizer
 Nicholas Hoffman – fiddle, background vocals
 John Jorgenson – electric guitar, ukulele 
 Paul Leim – cabasa, drums, percussion, shaker, timbales
 Randy McCormick – Hammond organ, piano, synthesizer, background vocals
 Liana Manis – background vocals
 The Nashville String Machine – strings
 Willie Nelson – vocals on "Pretty Paper"
 Paul Overstreet – background vocals
 Randy Owen – vocals on "Christmas in Dixie"
 Steve Patrick – trumpet
 Larry Paxton – bass guitar, upright bass, string arrangements
 Gary Prim – Wurlitzer
 Glen Rose – background vocals
 Shaun Silva – background vocals
 Allison Stewart – background vocals
 Kyle Stewart – background vocals
 Mark Tamburino – background vocals
 Kris Wilkinson – string arrangements
 John Willis – acoustic guitar, gut string guitar

Charts

Weekly charts

Year-end charts

Certifications

References

BNA Records albums
Kenny Chesney albums
Albums produced by Buddy Cannon
Albums produced by Norro Wilson
Christmas albums by American artists
2003 Christmas albums
Country Christmas albums